Benjamin Hayes, or Benjamin Ignatius Hayes, (1815–77) was an American pioneer who was the first judge of the district court that served Los Angeles, San Diego and San Bernardino counties in California. His seminal rulings are still cited in that state's courts.

Personal
Hayes was born on February 14, 1815, in Baltimore, Maryland, and graduated from St. Mary's University in that city. Shortly after graduation, he relocated to Missouri, but in 1849 he "set out from Independence, Missouri, for California, riding one mule and leading another packed with supplies for the trip." He joined a train of pioneers and reached a Mormon settlement near San Bernardino, California, in January 1850. He stopped again at Mission San Gabriel and reached the "pueblo of Los Angeles" on February 3, looked around, went back to San Gabriel, sold his mules and returned to stay in the pueblo.

Two of his sisters moved to Los Angeles as well. They were Helena, "the mother of Fred Eaton, one of the city's mayors; and Louisa, the first public school teacher. . . ."

A Roman Catholic, Hayes was married twice—first, on November 16, 1848, in St. Louis, Missouri, to Emily Martha Chauncey of Harford County, Maryland, who died in 1857, and second, on August 2, 1866, in San Diego, California,  to Adelaida Serrano. He had two children, John Chauncey and Mary Adelaida.

Hayes was joined by his wife Emily late in 1851, traveling "by packet to New Orleans, thence by steamer to Panama, which she crossed side saddle on a mule, then by steamer to San Diego." After she died in 1857, the  Lafayette Hotel was built on the property, where he reared his son and where Benjamin Hayes died on August 4, 1877.

Hayes was one of the men who helped bring the Sisters of Charity to Los Angeles to establish a hospital. Along with  Don Abel Stearns, Hon. Thomas Foster, Don Luis Vignes, Hon. Ezra Drown, Don Antonio F. Coronel, Don Manuel Requena, Don Ignacio del Valle and John G. Downey," he organized a committee to "solicit subscriptions from the citizens of this county" and to "act in co-operation with the Right Rev. Thaddeus Amat, Bishop of Monterey, in all matters necessary" in establishing the hospital." The hospital was the forerunner to today's St. Vincent Medical Center (Los Angeles).

Vocation

Private practice
In the 1840s Hayes began his practice of law in Independence, Missouri, and after arriving in Los Angeles he formed a law partnership with Jonathan R. Scott. He was a member of the Rangers, Los Angeles's first police force, all volunteers.

Public service

In the first Los Angeles County election on April 1, 1850, Hayes, a Democrat, was elected county attorney, "a prosecuting office then provided by law" serving until September 1851. In July of the same year he was elected the first city attorney in Los Angeles, and he served until May 1851.

In 1852 he was elected first judge of the district court that served Los Angeles, San Diego and San Bernardino counties; he was reelected in 1857. Hayes "journeyed over his district on horseback and later by carriage and the little steamer, Senator. Court he convened in whatever available structure there was."

In Los Angeles, in 1859, court was held in a dingy unhealthy old adobe standing at Franklin and Spring streets. When it rained[,] water came through the roof in streams onto the judge's head, his desk and papers, and spattered against the walls, making an umbrella a necessary adjunct of court attendance.

In 1856, he freed 14 enslaved black people, including Biddy Mason, who were held in captivity by Mormons in San Bernardino.

Hayes held court in both English and Spanish; he recorded in his diary that he was able to read and write Spanish with competence but that he was not fluent in speaking it. He also found a problem with the lack of lawbooks.

One biographer wrote that Hayes "courageously administered justice in the violent Fifties, when mob rule so frequently took matters under its own control." While he was county attorney in 1851[,]  a disgruntled litigant on horseback fired at him from three feet away, but the bullet passed harmlessly through Hayes' hat.

In his ten years on the district bench[,] litigation was heavy and important, and as it has transpired, history-making. Many of Judge Hayes's decisions have took the test of time and are references before the bar today, He is considered by posterity to have been a learned man, with a brilliant legal mind.]

Authorship
 "'Los Angeles County From 1847 to 1867," a chapter in An Historical Sketch of Los Angeles County, published in 1876
 Diaries and scrapbooks

Legacy
The Bancroft Library is in possession of Hayes' diaries, notes and scrapbooks.

References

External links
  Pioneer Notes From the Diaries of Judge Benjamin Hayes, 1849–1875, edited and privately published by Marjorie Tisdale Wolcott, Los Angeles (1929)
  Further biographical and genealogical information may be available from this Find a Grave listing.
  Election results for Los Angeles County in 1852, in Spanish, with reference to El Señor Don Benjamin Hayes
   Photo of Hayes near the end of his life.
 Finding aid to the Benjamin Ignatius Hayes Collection, Online Archive of California.
 The San Diego Natural History Museum Research Library houses a significant collection of Benjamin Ignatius Hayes’ scrapbooks.

1815 births
1877 deaths
Los Angeles City Attorneys
People from Baltimore
19th-century American lawyers
Writers from Los Angeles
California Democrats